An election to Wicklow County Council took place on 23 May 2014 as part of that year's Irish local elections. 32 councillors were elected from five electoral divisions (Arklow, Baltinglass, Bray, Greystones and Wicklow) by PR-STV voting for a five-year term of office, an increase of 8 seats from the previous election in 2009. In addition Arklow Town Council, Bray Town Council, Greystones Town Council and Wicklow Town Council were all abolished, as per the Local Government Reform Act 2014.

Independents proved to be the biggest winners in the elections, gaining 7 seats to return to the Council with 10 members. In addition Sinn Féin gained 4 additional seats on the Council, leaving them with 6 councillors in total. The additional seats helped to insulate Fine Gael from significant seat losses and they remained the largest party despite losing a seat overall. Fianna Fáil gained 3 seats overall to return with 7 members and though they had more first preference votes than Fine Gael, they won 1 less seat overall. Several of the successful Independents such as Joe Behan, Christopher Fox and Jim Ruttle all had former Fianna Fáil connections. The Labour Party polled disastrously in the election and were wiped out in what had been one of their former strongholds, losing all 6 seats. Outgoing councillor and outgoing Chairman, Jimmy O'Shaughnessy also lost his seat in the election. O'Shaughnessy was a former Labour member. However, 2 former Labour councillors, Tom Fortune and Tommy Cullen, were returned as Independents.

It was also notable that none of the mayors of the town councils were elected. Mick Glynn (FG; Bray), Malcolm Earls (FG; Wicklow) and Peter Dempsey (Ind; Arklow) all failed to be elected, while George Jones (FG; Greystones) retired after serving over 40 years as a Town Councillor and County Councillor.

Results by party

Results by Electoral Area

Arklow

Baltinglass

Bray

Greystones

Wicklow

Aftermath

Following the elections, the Fine Gael group with 8 councillors, the Fianna Fáil group with 7 councillors and an independent technical group of 4 councillors joined together to become the "official/government" side of the council, while the Sinn Féin group with 6 councillors, the Green Party councillor and an independent technical group of 5 councillors joined together to form the "opposition" side of the council. One independent councillor refused to join either side and remained on his own.

Following the election, at the first Annual General Meeting of the council, Christopher Fox (Independent) was elected Cathaoirleach (Chairman) of the Council. John Ryan (Fine Gael) was elected as Leas-Cathaoirleach (Vice-Chairman) of the Council.

The "control" of this council is now a rainbow coalition of Fine Gael/Fianna Fáil/Independent. The opposition side consists of Sinn Féin/Green Party/Independent.

References

Post-Election Changes
†Greystones Independent Cllr Jennifer Whitmore joined the Social Democrats on 14 November 2015.
††Wicklow Independent Cllr Pat Kavanagh died on 17 December 2015. Her sister, Mary, was co-opted to fill the vacancy on 7 March 2016.
†††Bray Sinn Féin Cllr John Brady was elected as a TD for Wicklow at the Irish general election, 2016. Michael O'Connor was co-opted to fill the vacancy in March 2016.
††††Wicklow Fianna Fáil Cllr Pat Casey was elected as a TD for Wicklow at the Irish general election, 2016. Gail Dunne was co-opted to fill the vacancy in March 2016.
†††††Following an internal row with Sinn Féin TD, John Brady, three Wicklow Cllrs Oliver O'Brien (Bray), Gerry O'Neill (Greystones) and John Snell (Wicklow) were stripped of the party whip and are now Independents. On 8 12 Oliver O'Brien joined Peadar Tóibín's new movement.
†††††† Arklow Sinn Féin Cllr Mary McDonald resigned from the party and became an Independent on 10 March 2019 saying she was restricted in what she could do at Council level.

External links
Wicklow County Council

2014 Irish local elections
2014